The Tupi or Tupian language family comprises some 70 languages spoken in South America, of which the best known are Tupi proper and Guarani.

Homeland and urheimat
Rodrigues (2007) considers the Proto-Tupian urheimat to be somewhere between the Guaporé and Aripuanã rivers, in the Madeira River basin. Much of this area corresponds to the modern-day state of Rondônia, Brazil. 5 of the 10 Tupian branches are found in this area, as well as some Tupi–Guarani languages (especially Kawahíb), making it the probable urheimat of these languages and maybe of its speaking peoples. Rodrigues believes the Proto-Tupian language dates back to around 3,000 BC.

Language contact
Tupian languages have extensively influenced many language families in South America. Jolkesky (2016) notes that there are lexical similarities with the Arawa, Bora-Muinane, Guato, Irantxe, Jivaro, Karib, Kayuvava, Mura-Matanawi, Taruma, Trumai, Yanomami, Harakmbet, Katukina-Katawixi, Arawak, Bororo, Karaja, Macro-Mataguayo-Guaykuru, Takana, Nadahup, and Puinave-Kak language families due to contact.

History, members and classification
When the Portuguese arrived in Brazil, they found that wherever they went along the vast coast of this newly discovered land, most natives spoke similar languages. Jesuit missionaries took advantage of these similarities, systematizing common standards then named línguas gerais ("general languages"), which were spoken in that region until the 19th century. The best known and most widely spoken of these languages was Old Tupi, a modern descendant of which is still used today by indigenous peoples around the Rio Negro region, where it is known as Nheengatu, or the "good language". However, the Tupi family also comprises other languages.

In the neighbouring Spanish colonies, Guarani, another Tupian language closely related to Old Tupi, had a similar history, but managed to resist the spread of Spanish more successfully than Tupi resisted Portuguese. Today, Guarani has 7 million speakers, and is one of the official languages of Paraguay. The Tupian family also includes several other languages with fewer speakers. These share irregular morphology with the Je and Carib families, and Rodrigues connects them all as a Je–Tupi–Carib family.

Rodrigues & Cabral (2012)
Rodrigues & Cabral (2012) list 10 branches of Tupian, which cluster into Western Tupian and Eastern Tupian. Within Western and Eastern Tupian, the most divergent branches are listed first, followed by the core branches.

Western Tupian
 Arikém (2 languages)
 Tuparí (6 languages)
 Mondé (6 languages)
 Puruborá
 Ramaráma (Rondônia) (2 languages)
Eastern Tupian
 Yurúna (Jurúna) (3 languages)
 Mundurukú (2 languages)
 Mawé
 Awetï
 Tupi–Guarani (50 languages: Tupí [extinct], Guaraní (5 million speakers), etc.)

Meira and Drude (2015) posit a branch uniting Mawé and Aweti with Tupi-Guarani, also known as Maweti-Guarani. Purubora may form a branch together with Ramarama.

Jolkesky (2016)
Internal classification by Jolkesky (2016):

(† = extinct)

Tupi family
Arikem
Arikem †
Karitiana
Monde
Paiter
Monde, Nuclear
Monde
Cinta-Larga-Zoro
Arua
Cinta-Larga
Gavião; Zoro
Ramarama-Purubora
Purubora
Ramarema: Karo; Urumi
Tupari
Makurap
Tupari, Nuclear
Sakurabiat-Akuntsu
Akuntsu
Sakurabiat
Kepkiriwat †
Tupari
Wayoro
Tupi, Nuclear
Juruna
Juruna
Manitsawa †
Shipaya
Munduruku
Kuruaya
Munduruku
Mawe-Aweti-Tupi-Guarani
Satere-Mawe
Aweti-Tupi-Guarani
Aweti
Tupi-Guarani (see)

Galucio et al. (2015)
Galucio et al. (2015) give the following phylogenetic tree of Tupian, based on a computational phylogenetic analysis.

Tupian
Western (40.6% probability)
Karo; Puruborá
Mondé
Suruí
Nuclear Mondé
Salamãy
Aruá; Gavião, Zoró
Eastern (40.6% probability)
Arikém
Karitiána
Tuparí
Makuráp
Nuclear Tuparí
Akuntsú, Mekéns
Wayoró, Tuparí
Mundurukú
Mundurukú
Kuruáya
Jurúna
Jurúna
Xipáya
Mawetí–Guaraní
Mawé
Awetí–Guaraní
Awetí
Tupí–Guaraní
Parintintín
Tapirapé; Urubú-Ka'apór, Paraguayan Guaraní

Vocabulary
Loukotka (1968) lists the following basic vocabulary items.

See also
 Apapocuva
 Indigenous languages of the Americas
 Languages of Brazil
 Língua Geral
 List of Spanish words of Indigenous American Indian origin

References

Further reading
Rodrigues, Aryon Dall'Igna (2007). "As consoantes do Proto-Tupí". In Ana Suelly Arruda Câmara Cabral, Aryon Dall'Igna Rodrigues (eds). Linguas e culturas Tupi, p. 167-203. Campinas: Curt Nimuendaju; Brasília: LALI.
Ana Vilacy Galucio & al., “Genealogical relations and lexical distances within the Tupian linguistic family,” Boletim do Museu Paraense Emílio Goeldi. Ciências Humanas 10, no. 2 (2015): 229-274. 
Ferraz Gerardi, F., Reichert, S., Blaschke, V., DeMattos, E., Gao, Z., Manolescu, M., and Wu, N. (2020) Tupían lexical database. Version 0.8. Tübingen: Eberhard-Karls University. 

Lexicons
Alves, P. (2004). O léxico do Tupari: proposta de um dicionário bilíngüe. Doctoral dissertation. São Paulo: Universidade Estadual Paulista.
Corrêa Da Ssila, B. C. (2010). Mawé/Awetí/Tupí-Guaraní: Relações Linguísticas e Implicações Históricas. Brasília: Universidade de Brasília. (Doctoral dissertation).
Landin, D. J. (2005). Dicionário e léxico Karitiana / Português. Cuiabá: SIL.
Lévi-Strauss, C. (1950). Documents Rama-Rama. Journal de la Société des Américanistes, 39:73-84.
Mello, A. A. S. (2000). Estudo histórico da família lingüística Tupí-Guaraní: aspectos fonológicos e lexicais. Florianópolis: Universidade Federal de Santa Catarina. (Doctoral dissertation).
Monserrat, R. F. (2000). Vocabulário Amondawa-Português, Vocabulário e frases em Arara e Português, Vocabulário Gavião-Português, Vocabulário e frases em Karipuna e Português, Vocabulário e frases em Makurap e Português, Vocabulário e frases em Suruí e Português, Pequeno dicionário em Tupari e Português. Caixas do Sul: Universidade do Caixas do Sul.
Monserrat, R. F. (2005). Notícia sobre a língua Puruborá. In: A. D. Rodrigues & A. S. A. C. Cabral (eds.), Novos estudos sobre línguas indígenas, 9-22. Brasília: Brasilia: Editor UnB.
Pacheco Ribeiro, M. J. (2010). Dicionário Sateré-Mawé/Português. Guajará-Mirim: Universidade Federal de Rondônia.
Rodrigues, A. D. (2007). As consoantes do Proto-Tupí. In: A. S. A. C. Cabral & A. D. Rodrigues (eds.), Línguas e culturas tupí, 167-203. Campinas: Curt Nimuendaju.
Rodrigues, A. D.; Cabral, A. S. (2012). Tupían. In: L. CAMPBELL & V. GRONDONA, (eds.), The indigenous languages of South America: a comprehensive guide, 495-574. Berlin/ Boston: Walter de Gruyter.

External links

TuLaR (Tupían Language Resources)
Swadesh lists of Tupi–Guarani basic vocabulary words (from Wiktionary's Swadesh-list appendix)
"A Arte da Língua Brasílica", grammar of Tupi, by Father Luiz Figueira, in Portuguese

 
Language families
Indigenous languages of Central Amazonia
Indigenous languages of Western Amazonia